Mphenyatsatsi is a village ("main place") in Bushbuckridge, Ehlanzeni District, Mpumalanga, South Africa.

Notes and references

Populated places in the Bushbuckridge Local Municipality